Al-Musaddar is a Palestinian village in the central Gaza Strip, part of the Deir al-Balah Governorate east of Deir al-Balah, south of the Maghazi refugee camp and west of the border with Israel. In the 1997 census its population was 1,277. Al-Musaddar had a population of 1,840 in 2006 according to the Palestinian Central Bureau of Statistics (PCBS).

See also
Hanajira

References

Villages in the Gaza Strip
Municipalities of the State of Palestine